Vitali Kokorine (born 3 January 1975) is a Russian racing cyclist. He rode in the 1997 Tour de France.

References

1975 births
Living people
Russian male cyclists
Place of birth missing (living people)